was a district located in Ibaraki Prefecture, Japan.

As of 2003, the district had an estimated population of 141,935 and a density of 404.21 persons per km2. The total area was 351.14 km2.

Mergers
 On September 1, 1995 - the town of Kashima absorbed the village of Ōno to create the city of Kashima.
 On August 1, 2005 - the town of Kamisu absorbed the town of Hasaki to create the city of Kamisu.
 On October 11, 2005 - the town of Hokota absorbed the villages of Asahi and Taiyō to create the city of Hokota. Therefore, Kashima District was dissolved as a result of this merger.

Former districts of Ibaraki Prefecture